The 2002 West Lancashire District Council election took place on 2 May 2002 to elect members of West Lancashire District Council in Lancashire, England. The whole council was up for election with boundary changes since the last election in 2000 reducing the number of seats by 1. The Conservative Party gained overall control of the council from Labour.

After the election the composition of the council was:

Campaign
Before the election Labour had 25 seats on the council, compared to 23 for the Conservatives. All the seats were being contested for the first time since 1974 after boundary changes had taken place. Among the candidates there was a record number of independents at 12, with 6 of them having defected from Labour.

Issues in the election including transport, housing and leisure facilities. The Labour Party said they were the only party that had the experience to run the council and pledged to remove charges for pensioners for pest control. However the Conservatives pledged to improve services, increase recycling, keep parking charges low, form partnerships with private firms to improve facilities, while making efficiency savings.

Election result
The results saw the Conservatives gain control of the council after winning 30 seats compared to 24 for Labour. The Conservatives won the seats in Ormskirk, while Labour held the seats in Skelmersdale. However the former Labour chairman of the council, Andrew Johnson, was defeated in the election in Aughton and Downholland ward after his former seat of Downholland was merged with the more Conservative Aughton in the boundary changes. All of the independent candidates were defeated in the election, which saw an overall turnout of 32.5%.

Ward results

Ashurst

Aughton and Downholland

Aughton Park

Bickerstaffe

Birch Green

Burscough East

Burscough West

Derby

Digmoor

Halsall

Hesketh-with-Becconsall

Knowsley

Moorside

Newburgh

North Meols

Parbold

Rufford

Scarisbrick

Scott

Skelmersdale North

Skelmersdale South

Tanhouse

Tarleton

Up Holland

Wrightington

References

2002
2002 English local elections
2000s in Lancashire